Here is a  list of characters represented in the Persian epic poem Shāhnāmeh by Ferdowsi, including both heroes and villains :

A 
 Arash
 Afrasiab
 Abteen
 Arnavaz
 Armin
 Arman

B 
 Babak
 Bārbad
 Bizhan
 Bahram
 Bahman 
 Borzou
 Bijan
 Behzad

E 
 Esfandyar

F 
Faramarz
Faranak
Farangis
Fereydun
Farhad

G 
 Garshasp
 Ghaaran
 Ghobad
 Giv
 Goodarz
 Gordafarid
 Garsivaz
 Giti

H 
 Haftvad
 Hushang

I 
 Īrāj
 Iskandar

J 
 Jamshid

K 
 Kaveh the blacksmith
 Kai Khosrow
 Keshvad
 Keyumars
 Kai Kavoos
 Katayoun
 Kasra
 kamus
 Kianoosh

M 
 Manuchehr
 Manijeh
 Mardas
 Mehrab Kaboli
 Mehran

N 
Nariman
Nowzar

Q 
Qaydafeh

R 
 Rakhsh
 Roham
 Rostam
 Rostam Farrokhzād
 Rudaba

S 
 Saam
 Salm
 Sasan
 Sekandar
 Sarv
 Shaghad
 Shahran Goraz
 Shahrasb
 Shahrnaz
 Shahzreh
 Shirin
 Simurgh
 Siamak
 Siyâvash
 Sohrab
 Sudabeh

T 
 Tahmina
 Tahmoores
 Tur

Z 
 Zal
 Zahhāk
 Zarvan
 Zoo Tahmasp

See also 
 Iranian literature
 Persian mythology

Persian literature